Hello, I Must Be Going! is the second solo studio album by English drummer and singer-songwriter Phil Collins. It was released on 5 November 1982 on Virgin Records in the United Kingdom and on Atlantic Records in North America, and named after the Marx Brothers' song of the same name. After his band Genesis took a break in activity in late 1981, Collins started work on a follow-up to his debut solo studio album Face Value (1981).

Hello, I Must Be Going! received a more reserved commercial reaction than Face Value, but it nonetheless reached No. 2 in the United Kingdom and No. 8 in the United States. In total, Collins released eight singles from the album, with various tracks released as singles in different countries. The most successful was the first US and second UK single, a cover of "You Can't Hurry Love" by the Supremes, which went to No. 1 in the United Kingdom and No. 10 in the United States. Collins supported the album with his 1982–1983 tour, his first as a solo artist. The album earned Collins a Brit Award nomination for British Male Artist in 1983, and "I Don't Care Anymore" was nominated for a Grammy Award for Best Rock Vocal Performance, Male.

Background and recording
In December 1981, Collins's band Genesis entered an eight-month break in activity after touring their eleventh studio album Abacab (1981). He started work on a follow-up to his first solo studio album, Face Value (1981), which mainly concerned events in his personal life including his divorce from his first wife. Collins was aware that Hello, I Must Be Going! contains even greater amounts of material concerning his private life, and reasoned its concentration down to feeling guilty regarding the divorce and "to be purely sentimental about it". He described the album years later: "If my first album was 'I'm divorced and I'm miserable' ... my next one was 'I'm going to kick this fucker to bits'". However, upon meeting his second wife Jill Tavelman and releasing Hello, I Must Be Going!, Collins noted a change in his songwriting: "[I'm] happier [...] I write happy songs now".

The album features elements of groove pop that Collins would utilise further with his next solo studio album, No Jacket Required (1985). "I Cannot Believe It's True" has been compared to "I Missed Again" from Face Value (1981) "right down to the undulating rhythms and swaying brass". Collins confessed to "a distinct lack of judgement" in recording the drums for "Thru These Walls" as the drum fill he used matched what he had done for "In the Air Tonight" from Face Value (1981). To him, that is the sole comparison between the two albums, despite being called out for rehashing similar material for Hello, I Must Be Going! In addition to this, according to Collins, "Don't Let Him Steal Your Heart Away" and "Why Can't It Wait 'Til Morning" were leftovers from the Face Value sessions in 1978-79.

Artwork
The album's sleeve contains various photographs from Collins's family life, which he had also done for Face Value (1981). Collins wanted both albums to be a "matching set, something that felt like it was from the same bloke". Included is a picture of his young son Simon in a Superman costume, which Collins found humorous to include but later found that some people misinterpreted it as focusing the album too much on his personal life.

Critical reception

Hugh Fielder of Sounds praised Hello, I Must Be Going! as "a broader, stronger and better executed follow-up to Face Value", writing, "The original inspiration may be second-hand but the execution and character is entirely his." In Rolling Stone, John Milward said of the record: "Despite its trend-bucking boast of an eight-track recording, the album's rich luster is of the old classical-rock school. In fact, the LP sounds like stripped-down Genesis, ornamental but not too ostentatious." NME writer Graham K. Smith was less enthused, criticising the lyrics as excessively self-pitying and the music as steeped in "blatant textbook commercialities"; he found that the album "resoundly collapses between the two stools of 'meaningful rock' and disposable pop, wallowing in all the worst aspects of both with none of the saving graces".

Retrospectively, AllMusic critic Stephen Thomas Erlewine stated that Collins "began to inject his highly melodic pop songwriting with more soul and R&B influences" on Hello, I Must Be Going!, with mixed results: "While some of the material was successful, much of it showed that he was still coming to grips with how to incorporate R&B techniques into his style." In a later review of the album for AllMusic, Tim Sendra was more favourable, deeming it "a winning follow-up that shows Collins to be in full control of songwriting and production".

Tour

Collins supported the album with a concert tour of Europe and North America between November 1982 and February 1983. He performed with a nine-piece band that included Genesis touring musicians Chester Thompson and Daryl Stuermer, and the Phenix Horns.

Reissue
The album was re-released and remastered by Steve Hoffman for the Audio Fidelity label in 2011 on Gold CD. The album was also reissued as part of the Take a Look at Me Now series of Collins studio album remasters during 2016, with a new second disc of bonus songs.

Track listing

2016 reissue

Personnel
Musicians

Production and artwork
 Phil Collins – producer
 Hugh Padgham – assistant producer, engineer
 Howard Gray – assistant engineer
 Martyn Ford – engineer (for orchestral tracks)
 Mike Ross – engineer
 Ian Cooper – mastering
 Trevor Key – cover photography

Charts

Certifications

References

External links
 Official artist website

1982 albums
Atlantic Records albums
Phil Collins albums
Island Records albums
Albums produced by Phil Collins
Albums produced by Hugh Padgham
Virgin Records albums
Warner Music Group albums
Albums recorded in a home studio